The 2021–22 World Rugby Sevens Series was the 23rd annual series of rugby sevens tournaments for national men's rugby sevens teams. The Sevens Series has been run by World Rugby since 1999.

Second-placed South Africa opened the competition by winning the first four tournaments, with a 36 match winning streak that lasted until the 2022 Singapore Sevens where they were beaten by the United States in pool play, but they did not make the semifinals in any of the remaining events.

There was no relegation required at the end of the season as the number of core teams was reduced when England, Scotland and Wales were combined to play as Great Britain for the 2022–23 series.

Core teams
The core teams remained unchanged from the previous series due to the impacts of the COVID-19 pandemic which curtailed the last two seasons. The sixteen core teams qualified to participate in all 2021–22 tournaments were: 

Notes

Tour venues
The schedule for the series was:

Notes

Standings

Due to the impacts of the COVID-19 pandemic, World Rugby revised the method used for the series standings in the interest of fairness to teams not able to participate in all rounds of the 2021–22 season. This system excluded the two lowest-scored rounds from each team in the final standings. So, with nine tournaments in the series, only the best seven tournament results for each team contributed to the ranking points.

The points awarded to teams at each event, as well as the overall season totals, are shown in the table below. Points for the event winners are indicated in bold. An asterisk (*) indicates a tied placing. An obelisk (†) is recorded in the event column where a low-scoring round is excluded from a core team's ranking points. A dash (—) is recorded where a team did not compete.

Source: World Rugby

{| class="wikitable" style="font-size:92%;"
|-
!colspan=2| Legend  
|-
|No colour
|Core team
|-
|bgcolor=#ffc|Yellow
|Invited team
|}

Notes

Placings summary
Tallies of top-four placings in tournaments during the 2021–22 series, by team:

Player statistics

Scoring

Updated: 29 August 2022

Performance

 

Key: T = Tackles (1 pt), B = Line breaks (3 pts), O = Offloads (2 pts), C = Carries (1 pt)

Updated: 29 August 2022

Tournaments

Dubai I

Dubai II

Malaga

Seville

Singapore

Vancouver

Toulouse

London

Los Angeles

See also
 2021–22 World Rugby Women's Sevens Series
 Rugby sevens at the 2020 Summer Olympics (played in 2021)
 Rugby sevens at the 2022 Commonwealth Games (only members of the Commonwealth of Nations)

References

External links
Official site

 
World Rugby Sevens Series